Claud Charles John Hancox is a New Zealand rugby football player who represented New Zealand in rugby league.

Playing career
Hancox originally played rugby union. He played for the Warkworth Rugby Football Club and is one of only four players from that club to have represented North Auckland. Hancox played for North Auckland against Australia during their 1946 tour of New Zealand. North Auckland won the match 32-19.

At the same time, Hancox also played rugby league for the Otahuhu Leopards. He was part of the Otahuhu side that won the 1945 Auckland Rugby League competition and he also represented Auckland.

In 1947 he was selected for the New Zealand squad as part of their tour of Great Britain. He did not play in any test matches on the tour.

References

Living people
New Zealand rugby league players
New Zealand national rugby league team players
Auckland rugby league team players
Otahuhu Leopards players
Rugby league second-rows
New Zealand rugby union players
Northland rugby union players
Year of birth missing (living people)
Place of birth missing (living people)